Majurec   is a village in Croatia. It is connected by the D41 highway.

Populated places in Koprivnica-Križevci County